Concrete jungle may refer to:

Music

Albums
 Concrete Jungle (David "Fathead" Newman album), 1977
 Concrete Jungle (Dive album), or the title song, 1993
 Concrete Jungle (Nneka album), 2010
 Concrete Jungle (Scorcher album), 2009
 Concrete Jungle (Sway & King Tech album), or the title song, 1990
 Concrete Jungle Vol. 1, or the title song, by South Central Cartel, 1999

Songs
"Concrete Jungle" (Black Label Society song), 2006
"Concrete Jungle", by Bob Marley and The Wailers from Catch a Fire, 1973
"Concrete Jungle", by Big Youth from Screaming Target, 1973
"Concrete Jungle", by The Specials from The Specials, 1979
"In the Jungle (Concrete Jungle)", by The Motels from the soundtrack of the film Teachers, 1984
"Concrete Jungle", a 2016 single by Au/Ra

Other media
 The Concrete Jungle (1960 film) or The Criminal, a British film directed by Joseph Losey
 The Concrete Jungle (film), a 1982 American women-in-prison film
 The Concrete Jungle (novella), a 2004 short novel by Charlie Stross, collected in The Atrocity Archives
 Concrete Jungle (supplement), a 1985 supplement for the role-playing game Marvel Super Heroes
 Concrete Jungle (video game), a 2015 strategy game
 Concrete Jungle: The Legend of the Black Lion, a 1998 comic book by Christopher Priest

See also 
 The Asphalt Jungle, a 1950 film noir